is a Japanese light novel series written by Tsunehiko Watanabe. The series originated on the Shōsetsuka ni Narō website in June 2011, before being published in print with illustrations by Jū Ayakura by Shufunotomo beginning in September 2012. A manga adaptation with illustrations by Neko Hinotsuki began serialization in the Young Ace magazine in February 2017.

Synopsis
Zenjiro Yamai who is your everyday office worker in modern Japan suddenly finds himself summoned to another world. The person who summoned him - Queen Aura - wants him to marry her and leave his old life behind for a life of carefree extravagance as her Husband and Prince Consort. He is told that if he accepts, he only needs to provide her an heir. Other than that, he can laze around all day with no worries, and he’ll never have to work again as he did in his old life in Japan. After accepting her offer, he finds himself in a world that has Magic, different culture with nobilities who have hidden agendas and ambitious schemes. A world where a simple word or gift carries hidden meanings.

Characters

A salaryman from Japan who got summoned to Another World and ended up marrying the Queen of Kingdom of Capua, Aura Capua and became the Prince Consort. After that, his name changed to Zenjiro Capua. He eventually finds out that he is a user of the "Space-Time" Bloodline Magic.

She is the Queen and the last surviving Royalty of the Kingdom of Capua and the wife of Zenjiro Yamai. She is a user of the "Space-Time" Bloodline Magic. At first, she married Zenjiro for political reasons, but then she has come to genuinely love him.

She is the 1st Princess of the Kingdom of Uppasala and the Captain of "Glasir's Leaf", the 8th ship belonging to the Kingdom of Uppasala's Navy. She came to Capua in search of a new trade route.

She is Working in the Inner Palace of the Kingdom of Capua, as one of the Head Maid's supervising the Cleaning Staff. She is highly trusted by both Queen Aura and Zenjiro. Whenever Zenjiro takes trips, she is the maid assigned to accompany him as an aide.

He works as the head Secretary for Queen Aura along with working as a consultant. He always speaks candidly and is a person who isn't afraid to give his honest and harsh opinion even to the Queen.
 / Skaji
A highly capable warrior from the Kingdom of Uppasala who is serving as the attendant and bodyguard of Freya Uppasala. She is strong enough that she took down an alpha wyvern single-handedly.

A General in the Army of the Kingdom of Capua and a highly ambitious man with both skills and strength to support his goal. Also a former marriage candidate of Aura Capua.

A Palace Knight working in Kingdom of Capua. After Zenjiro gives him a wyvern bow, he swears his loyalty to him and is appointed as his Personal Knight.

He is the 3rd and youngest son of Margrave "Miguel Gaziel", the only surviving heir of the Gaziel Family since the death of his two older brothers during the Great War.

Media

Light novel
Written by Tsunehiko Watanabe, the series began publication on the novel posting website Shōsetsuka ni Narō on June 25, 2011. The series was later acquired by Shufunotomo, who began publishing the series in print with illustrations by Jū Ayakura on September 28, 2012. It was one of the first batch of works published by Hero Bunko imprint. As of September 2021, 14 volumes have been released.

In November 2020, J-Novel Club announced that they licensed the series for English publication.

Volume list

Manga
A manga adaptation, illustrated by Neko Hinotsuki, began serialization in Kadokawa Shoten's Young Ace magazine on February 3, 2017. As of December 2022, the series' individual chapters have been collected into 16 tankōbon volumes.

In March 2018, Seven Seas Entertainment announced that they licensed the series for English publication.

Volume list

Reception
Theron Martin from Anime News Network praised the treatment of the series' sensitive subject matter, though he also criticized the world building.

The series has 2.7 million copies in circulation.

References

External links
  
  
  
 

2012 Japanese novels
Anime and manga based on light novels
Isekai anime and manga
Isekai novels and light novels
J-Novel Club books
Japanese webcomics
Light novels
Light novels first published online
Romantic comedy anime and manga
Seven Seas Entertainment titles
Shōnen manga
Shōsetsuka ni Narō
Webcomics in print